Cherry cake may refer to any cake containing cherries:

 a traditional British pound cake featuring glacé cherries in a Madeira sponge
Black Forest gateau, a traditional German chocolate cake with cherry filling
Gâteau Basque, a traditional Basque French pastry filled with black cherry jam

See also
Cherri M. Pancake
List of cherry dishes